Rohrdorf may refer to:

Rohrdorf, Bavaria in the district of Rosenheim in Bavaria
Rohrdorf in Baden-Württemberg
Rohrdorf in Aargau, Switzerland

pt:Rohrdorf (Rosenheim)